Guru Jayarama Rao is a Guru and performer of Kuchipudi style, the classical dance of Andhra Pradesh, India. He has extended the Kuchipudi repertoire.

Belonging to a family of traditional artists of Andhra Pradesh, Guru Jayarama Rao was trained from his childhood in the traditional Guru Shishya Parampara. He graduated from The Siddhendra Kala Kshetram and later trained under Vempati Chinna Satyam.

After his arrival in Delhi to open a Kuchipudi school, he has trained many students in this art. Some of his prominent students were Swapna Sundari, Meenakshi Sesadri, Vanashree Rao, his wife and dance partner.

He is a member of the Expert committee on Kuchipudi in the HRD Ministry, Govt. of India, and a senior Fellowship holder for his research on Kuchipudi.

He has received the PADMASRI (2004) and the Sangeet Natak Akademi Award (1999), along with Vanashree, given by the hon’ble President Of India, The Delhi State Award, and The Andhra Pradesh Samman. He is also the recipient of the INDIRA PRIYADARSHINI AWARD (Nov 2003). In 2005, The Sanmukhananda Sabha felicitated him with the Natyaratna Award.

See also 
 Kuchipudi
 Vempati Chinna Satyam

References

External links 
 

Recipients of the Padma Shri in arts
Living people
Indian male dancers
Kuchipudi exponents
Indian choreographers
Recipients of the Sangeet Natak Akademi Award
Performers of Indian classical dance
1951 births
Place of birth missing (living people)
Dancers from Andhra Pradesh
20th-century Indian dancers